Crimson Fox is a codename for two superheroines appearing in American comic books published by DC Comics.

Publication history
The first two holders of the Crimson Fox moniker first appeared in Justice League Europe #6 and were created by Keith Giffen and Bart Sears. Identical twins, Vivian and Constance D'Aramis shared the role of Crimson Fox to allow each something of a normal life, although Vivian was much more enthusiastic about their superheroic life. Crimson Fox originally appeared as part of Justice League Europe.

The unrevealed Crimson Fox first appeared in Green Lantern vol. 4 #11.

Fictional character biography

Vivian and Constance D'Aramis
The sisters ran Revson, a major Parisian perfume company (which may perhaps explain the origin of their pheromone powers). To make their heroic actions easier, they faked Constance's death, so that one of them could operate as Crimson Fox (La Renard Rouge or La Renard Rousse in French) while the other attended business functions. Readers of her/their comic book appearances could easily tell the difference between the two due to Vivian's more pronounced French accent. She was also always portrayed as a more carefree and outgoing woman than her sister. Both sisters (first Vivian, and later Constance) fell in love with fellow hero Metamorpho.

The first two Crimson Foxes are deceased. Vivian D'Aramis met her fate at the hands of French supervillain Puanteur in Justice League International #104 (October 1995). Puanteur died in the same issue. When the Justice League Europe team was reformed as La Fraternité de Justice et Liberté, the team did not know that member Icemaiden had been surreptitiously replaced by the daughter of supervillain The Mist. This new Mist killed three members of the team, including slitting Constance D'Aramis' throat, in Starman (vol. 2) #38.

Unrevealed
One Year Later in the pages of Green Lantern (vol. 4) #11, (June 2006), it was revealed that a new woman has taken the mantle of the Crimson Fox, again operating as a French superhero in Paris. She was unwillingly pressed into service and membership by the Global Guardians, who intended to pursue Green Lantern.

The new Crimson Fox told Hal Jordan that she is the heiress to the D'Aramis fortune, though her specific relationship to Vivian and Constance, as family or otherwise, remains unknown.

Powers and abilities
The original Crimson Fox twins had superhuman speed and agility and could emit pheromones that stimulated intense sexual attraction in men. Their gloves were equipped with deadly steel talons. After Vivian's death, Constance retreated into her animal persona and developed enhanced senses.

The new Crimson Fox has a similarly equipped costume as the previous version and seems to possess identical pheromone powers.

In other media

Television
 Crimson Fox makes non-speaking appearances in Justice League Unlimited as part of the expanded Justice League.
 Crimson Fox appears in Powerless, portrayed by Atlin Mitchell in the pilot episode "Wayne or Lose" and by Deanna Russo in subsequent episodes.

Merchandise
The Vivian D'Aramis incarnation of Crimson Fox received an action figure in Mattel's Justice League Unlimited toyline as part of a six-pack. Mattel planned to release individual figures of Crimson Fox, but the line was cancelled.

Notes

References

Articles about multiple fictional characters
Comics characters introduced in 1989
DC Comics characters with superhuman senses
DC Comics female superheroes
Fictional French people
Fictional identical twins
Characters created by Keith Giffen